Perazine (Taxilan) is a moderate-potency typical antipsychotic of the phenothiazine class. It is quite similar to chlorpromazine, and acts as a dopamine antagonist. A 2014 systematic review compared it with other antipsychotic drugs:

Synthesis

Phenothiazine-10-propionitrile [1698-80-2] (1) is treated with a mixture of acid and alcohol giving Methyl phenothiazinepropionate, CID:368244 (2). Heating with 1-methylpiperazine (3) gives the amide [91508-47-3] (4). Reduction of this last by means of diborane yields Perazine (5).

See also 
Carphenazine
Dixyrazine
Methdilazine
Pipamazine

References

External links 

Typical antipsychotics
Phenothiazines